Transnational marriages in the Sino-Vietnamese border areas of China have rapidly increased since the re-opening of the border in the 1990s. In the Sino-Vietnamese border areas, the building of intimation relationship is usually between a Chinese man and a Vietnamese woman. Historically, transnational marriages were common due to unclear state and ethnic boundaries in border areas. In the modern era, the formation of transnational marriages here is multifold. Thereinto, imbalanced economic development in border areas of China and Vietnam is one of the most significant incentives.  

For transnational spouses in the Sino-Vietnamese border areas, Vietnamese wives usually follow their local Chinese husbands and live with their husbands’ families in China's borderlands, usually in villages or small towns. Some of them are officially married and finish the process of registration in the local administration. Yet, the cases of undocumented marriages are still in a huge number. The welfare and conditions of those Vietnamese women who are de facto wives of local Chinese men but unofficially recognized are one of the major concerns researched by many scholars.

The option to join an international intimacy, on the one hand, is sometimes voluntary both for Vietnamese women and especially Chinese men in the Sino-Vietnamese border areas. Transnational spouses meet each other either via border trade, arrangement (by family members or relatives), matchmakers/brokers, etc. However, on the other hand, some are forced due to thriving marriage trafficking in the Sino-Vietnamese border areas. Vietnamese women and girls are usually the main targets to be kidnapped and smuggled across the border. They are forced or sold to prostitution or marriage. Trafficked Vietnamese wives are often sold to poorer local Chinese men in small border villages, where some are subject to physical torture and mental abuse. Although relative academic research and data are inadequate, the scholars concerned believe such abuses against trafficked Vietnamese wives remain widespread problems.

History 
Historically, marriages in the mountain area between China and its southern neighbour, Vietnam, had taken place within the ethnic community networks all the time since loosely border control from both states. For a long time, ethnic marriages among ethnically related people but geographically crossing the border have been viewed as customary practice and tolerated.

Along with the establishment of the People's Republic of China and the independence of Vietnam (the establishment of the Socialist Republic of Vietnam), fixed border boundaries and countries’ relations to some extent restrict the formation of transnational marriage. 

From the 1950s, China's government approved the transnational marriages among Chinese and Vietnamese due to the good relationship with Vietnam. In 1953, there were 105 Vietnamese wives in 20 border villages of Longzhou County, and in some villages, 36 to 45 percent of marriages were transnational marriages.

Following the deteriorating relationship between China and Vietnam in 1979 till the normalization of bilateral relations in 1991, transnational marriages sharply declined during this period. Even though in the turbulent years of the border war, the investigation conducted by scholars found between 1979 and 1985, 122 Vietnamese women crossed the border and settled in China with their local Chinese husbands. Other regional research found that from 1985 to 1991, 232 Chinese men married Vietnamese women in a border village of Jingxi County. In 1990, 253 undocumented transnational marriages occurred in Longzhou County. 

Since the Sino-Vietnamese border reopened in 1991, the rapid modernization of borderlands has been witnessed increasing border trade, economic cooperation, labor mobility, etc. Transnational marriages have experienced dramatic growth in this process.

Incentives for choosing transnational marriages

Marrying a Vietnamese woman 

 serious gender imbalance in China: there were 24 million more man than women who are coming of age to get married in 2020.  In the future decades, the gap between marriageable men and women will continue to expand by looking at the ratio of male and female youth. Nearly three-decade one-child policy which ended in 2015 is one of the main reasons. Besides, selective abortions of favouring boys than girls influenced by the traditional belief which only men are eligible to pass down the family lineages exacerbate such imbalance under the one-child policy.

 shortage of Chinese women in border villages of China:  more and more Chinese women born in the border villages migrant to much more developed cities either for pursuing education, finding well-paid job opportunities or seeking husbands "with slightly higher educational, financial and social status." A few of them will choose to come back in their home villages and marry a local poorer men.

 high prices for marrying a local bride:in China's rural areas, including the borderlands, building a new house is the first task for a Chinese bachelor to marry a local Chinese woman. Meanwhile, the bride's parents usually ask dowry to marry their daughter that rural Chinese men can hardly afford. Therefore, the overall expenditure of building a house, dowry money, wedding ceremony, and gifts for the bride will be heavy for Chinese men living in rural border areas.
capable Vietnamese wives: Vietnamese women enjoy a good reputation in Chinese people living in border areas. They are favoured by more focusing on family and very capable for agricultural work and household jobs, compared to women from other neighbour countries.
For the aforementioned reasons, China's bachelors have to live lonely, and all family members, as well as their relatives, are eager to find a bride for them. Therefore, paying a relatively cheap price for marrying or buying a capable Vietnamese bride with similar cultural backgrounds and the ability to easily cross the border has been an alternative choice.

Marrying a Chinese man 

 romantic encounters: many young Vietnamese women take advantage of geography - border- to actively participate in economic exchanges, such as trade, tourism, labor force, etc. in trade zones/ corridors. Some of them even equip with multilingual skills to cross back and forth of the border. In this process, it is easy to meet their future Chinese husband while working. In some border areas of China, more than 50 percent of all Chinese-Vietnamese marriages begin with this kind of an international connection.
 pressure for being a Vietnamese daughter: under the pressure of traditional gender roles and expectations, Vietnamese adult daughters are expected to bring remittances to their natal families for paying back the upbringing. Therefore, most of them wish to marry up to find a good husband - having money and focusing on family- to fulfil this expectation. Compared to the poor local Vietnamese men, they believe  their neighbouring Chinese men living in a more economic-developed country will be good choices. Many of them will obey the arranged marriages with Chinese men or even seek the help for marriage agency to find a Chinese husband. However, some scholars argue that most of Vietnamese women who married Chinese men failed to offer the remittances to their natal families based on their surveys. The main reason for this was because they did not have any savings in their husbands’ families.
Vietnamese women who meet their Chinese husbands in these ways know them fairly well before their marriages. However, there are also some cases of Vietnamese women are trafficked and sold to their Chinese husbands whom they never know before.

Legality of transnational marriages

Registered 
Vietnamese wives who officially marry their Chinese husbands and finish the procedure of marriage registration in local administration of China can be granted legal status, which means they could have  passports, visas and resident permits to legally stay in China. Besides, their legal document paper will also allow them to pass through checkpoints if they want to travel to inlands. They are as the same as other foreigners who legally live in China.

Unregistered 
While registered transnational marriages are encouraged by the local administration of China, there are still many undocumented Sino-Vietnamese couples. Some couples who live in remote border villages don't tend to register their marriages. On the one hand, it is unreachable to the local administration due to terrain obstruction. On the other hand, the wedding ceremony, this customary practice remains a  more significant function for marriages than the bureaucratic procedures both in Chinese and Vietnamese martial traditions. In this regard, they think that it is unnecessary to apply for marriage registration. While some live in the city, close to the local administration, Vietnamese wives do not meet the conditions necessary to apply for documents and remain officially invisible. For undocumented Vietnamese wives who live in urban settings, they either resident  in China with temporary permits, going back and forth to Vietnam, or they manage to navigate their isolated everyday life by escaping the inquires. Yet, the technically illegal status places them in a vulnerable position. Some of them, subject the domestic violence from their Chinese husbands,  seldom seek help from others or local authority or organisations, such as women's federation, because of the fear of the separation from their children by asking to go back to Vietnam.

The local administrations of China tend to be permissive towards unregistered Sino-Vietnamese marriages. This is mainly because binational marriages between Chinese men and Vietnamese women to some extent reduce the crisis of China's bachelors' marital problems since these lonely men could be a big threat to social stability. Moreover, large-scale deportation is hard to operate. On the one hand, the chaotic administration and uneven regulations in Sino-Vietnamese borderlands make easy and unpunished border crossings also with the help of natural geographical advantages. On the other hand, the forced separation between illegal Vietnamese women and their husbands as well as their children might also disturb social stability. In the past, the concerns from the local administrations of China are few. However, in recent years, with the influx of more and migrants into the Sino-Vietnamese borderlands, the local administrations are continuing to tighten the policy of migrant management.

Human trafficking 
The increasing migration flows between the Sino-Vietnamese borderlands are accompanied by a thriving human trafficking market. The increasing migration flows between the Sino-Vietnamese borderlands are accompanied by a thriving human trafficking market. In most cities/counties/villages of Southwestern China, especially in Guangxi, the severe female deficit caused the inflation of marrying a bride from local communities. Therefore, many poor border Chinese men would turn their eyes with relatively cheaper alternatives - Vietnamese brides.

The surplus of Chinese bachelors and the gain of tens of thousands of dollars on a sale no doubt attract the attention of traffickers. There is no typical profile of a trafficker. They could be anyone - "from young, unemployed school dropouts, to elderly women selling tea in a marketplace, to even fellow teenage girls."  A cross-border human trafficking ring could contain dozens of members. For example, China's railway police in southwest China's Yunnan Province arrested 23 suspects of a trafficking ring and rescued 11 abducted Vietnamese women in 2019.

Traffickers often target those Vietnamese women and girls who reside in remote areas with a low level of education. This group of people desires to go out for better job opportunities to improve their living standards. Traffickers lure them from home to the unknown destination by the promise of good jobs and good husbands. Most of them are sold to a foreign husband from different countries and regions, including China, or become forced labor in the sex industry.  To make these trafficked women and girls obedient, unscrupulous traffickers usually beat and rape them. Most of them are subject to physical abuse and mental torture.   

These kidnapped Vietnamese wives tend to have a much miserable life compared with those voluntary. They not only function with gender norms – doing housekeeping and giving birth to the next generation for their husband's family, but also shoulder heavy agricultural fieldwork. “They were both wives and domestic workers for the family they lived with.”  Physical and mental abuse to kidnapped Vietnamese brides from Chinese husbands and their families are commonplace in many villages.   

To date, more and more scholars, NGOs and civil organisations ask more attention from both China and Vietnam's governments to rescue more trafficked Vietnamese women and girls and establish the prevention mechanism.

Others

Marriage cheater: Vietnamese brides 
In recent decades, Vietnam brides have become more and more popular with China's bachelors both in the Sino-Vietnamese border areas and inlands of China. China's bachelors have been the target cheated either by Vietnamese women themselves or marriage agency. They are asked to pay for a large amount of money to marry a Vietnamese bride. Some of them successfully get married with their Vietnamese bride but later, the Vietnamese women will flee and find other targets. Some instead will never wait for their brides.

Vietnamese social attitudes towards Sino-Vietnamese marriages 
Vietnamese social attitudes towards binational marriages between Chinese men and Vietnamese women across borderlands are polarised. The negative side believes that Vietnamese women sell their body for money. Such transitional marriages belong to sexual industries. They humiliate their Vietnamese family and community. Another said prizes them as being very courageous since they choose a difficult means to fulfil their gender responsibilities and family values. The state voices towards marriage migration (not only migration to China, but also to other countries and regions) are “shame of the nation”, “undutiful daughters not fulfilling their duties towards their country and families”.

References

See also 

 Transnational marriage

 International marriage of Vietnamese women
 Vietnamese migrant brides in Taiwan
 Asian migrant brides in Japan
 Marriage in South Korea#Marriages between Koreans and non-Koreans

International marriage
Women in Vietnam
China–Vietnam relations
Vietnamese expatriates in China